Shuya is the third largest town in Ivanovo Oblast, Russia; located on the Teza River.  Population:

History

The first record of Shuya is dated by 1393. Since 1403, the area was held by a branch of the House of Suzdal, which got their name "Shuysky" after the town. In 1539, the town was sacked by Safa Giray of Kazan. In 1566, it was taken by Ivan the Terrible as his personal property into Oprichnina. In 1722, the town was visited by Peter the Great, who launched textile manufacturing there. Town status was granted to it in 1778. By the 19th century, Shuya was developed into a major flax-processing center, although it has been since superseded in importance by the neighboring town of Ivanovo.

Administrative and municipal status
Within the framework of administrative divisions, Shuya serves as the administrative center of Shuysky District, even though it is not a part of it. As an administrative division, it is incorporated separately as the Town of Shuya—an administrative unit with the status equal to that of the districts. As a municipal division, the Town of Shuya is incorporated as Shuya Urban Okrug.

Architecture

It was first mentioned in 1425. It has a cathedral from 1652 and a refectory church from 1678.

The belltower of the Resurrection Cathedral in Shuya is the tallest freestanding bell tower in the world.

Notable people
Notable people from Shuya include peasant Feodor Vassilyev, whose first wife still holds the world record for most children ever born (sixty-nine). Mikhail Frunze led textile workers in the town in a strike action during the Revolution of 1905.

See also
List of tallest Orthodox church buildings
Shuysky

References

Notes

Sources

External links

Official website of Shuya 
Nikolo-Shartomsky Abbey 
Museum of Mikhail Frunze 

Cities and towns in Ivanovo Oblast
Shuysky Uyezd
Golden Ring of Russia